The 2019 Men's EuroHockey Indoor Club Cup was the 30th edition of the Men's EuroHockey Indoor Club Cup, Europe's premier club indoor hockey tournament organized by the EHF. It was held from 15 to 17 February in the Wiener Stadthalle in Vienna, Austria.

Partille won their first title by defeating the hosts Arminen 3–1 in the final, UHC Hamburg took the bronze medal and Amsterdam and Rotweiss Wettingen were relegated to the Trophy division.

Teams
Participating clubs have qualified based on their country's final ranking from the 2018 competition (Host is highlighted in bold).

Results
All times are local, CET (UTC+1).

Preliminary round

Pool A

Pool B

Fifth to eighth place classification

Pool C
The points obtained in the preliminary round against the other team are taken over.

First to fourth place classification

Semi-finals

Third and fourth place

Final

Statistics

Final standings

 Relegated to the EuroHockey Indoor Club Trophy

Top goalscorers

Awards
The following individual awards were given at the conclusion of the tournament.

References

Men's EuroHockey Indoor Club Cup
Club Cup Men
International indoor hockey competitions hosted by Austria
EuroHockey Indoor Club Cup Men
Sports competitions in Vienna
EuroHockey Indoor Club Cup Men
2010s in Vienna